Tabaré is a male name of Guarani origin, meaning "village man". It is used mainly in Uruguay. Notable people with the name include:
 Tabaré Aguerre (born 1957), Uruguayan agronomist and politician
 , Uruguayan folklorist
 , Uruguayan musician
 , Uruguayan folklorist
 Tabaré Gallardo, Uruguayan astronomer
 , Uruguayan-Argentine cartoonist
 Tabaré Hackenbruch (1928–2017), Uruguayan politician
 Tabaré Larre Borges (1922–?), Uruguayan basketball player
 Tabaré Ramos, Uruguayan-American football coach
 , Uruguayan musician
 Tabaré Silva (born 1974), Uruguayan football coach
 Tabaré Vázquez (1940–2020), Uruguayan oncologist and former President
 Tabaré Viera, Uruguayan politician
 Tabaré Viúdez (born 1989), Uruguayan footballer

Masculine given names
South American given names